Kristián Vallo (born 2 June 1998) is a Slovak professional footballer who plays as a right-back for Ekstraklasa club Wisła Płock and the Slovakia national team.

Club career

MŠK Žilina
He made his Fortuna Liga debut for Žilina against Zemplín Michalovce on 4 March 2016. He debuted by replacing Jakub Michlík four minutes before stoppage time. Žilina lost 2–3.

International career
Vallo was first recognised in a senior national team nomination on 16 March 2022 by Štefan Tarkovič as an alternate defender ahead of two international friendly fixtures against Norway and Finland. When Francesco Calzona took over from Tarkovič in the summer of 2022, Vallo was called-up for two September 2022–23 UEFA Nations League C fixtures. He made his debut on 22 September 2022 at Štadión Antona Malatinského in a fixture against Azerbaijan, which concluded in an upsetting 1–2 defeat following a stoppage time drama. Vallo completed the entirety of the match. In a subsequent match against Belarus, Vallo remained benched. He was also nominated for November friendlies against Montenegro and Chile, suffering an injury in the first match, as well as prospective player's training camp at NTC Senec in December.

References

External links
 MŠK Žilina official club profile 
 
 Futbalnet profile 
  (archive)
 Eurofotbal profile 

1998 births
Living people
Sportspeople from Žilina
Slovak footballers
Slovak expatriate footballers
Slovakia international footballers
Slovakia youth international footballers
Slovakia under-21 international footballers
Association football defenders
MŠK Žilina players
Wisła Płock players
2. Liga (Slovakia) players
Slovak Super Liga players
Ekstraklasa players
Expatriate footballers in Poland
Slovak expatriate sportspeople in Poland